In Silence They March is Crystal Eyes' second album, released in 2000 by Crazy Life Music. It was released again in 2005 under Crystal Eyes' new label, Heavy Fidelity.

Track listing
"Time Flight" - 6:17 
"Cursed and Damned" - 4:44
"Sons of Odin" - 6:22
"The Grim Reaper's Fate" - 5:10
"The Undead King" - 1:32
"In Silence They March" - 5:49
"Adrian Blackwood" - 5:15
"Witch Hunter" - 6:16
"The Rising" - 4:25
"Knights of Prey" - 5:12
"Somewhere Over the Sun" - 4:55
"Winternight" - 6:20

Credits
Mikael Dahl - Vocals and Guitar
Jonathan Nyberg - Guitar
Claes Wikander - Bass Guitar
Kujtim Gashi - Drums

Production, recording, mixing, and mastering by Crystal Eyes and Detlef Mohrmann.

Crystal Eyes albums
2000 albums